The 2001 Metro Atlantic Athletic Conference baseball tournament took place from May 18 through 20, 2001. The top four regular season finishers of the league's teams met in the double-elimination tournament held at Dutchess Stadium in Wappingers Falls, New York.  won their second consecutive (and second overall) tournament championship and earned the conference's automatic bid to the 2001 NCAA Division I baseball tournament.

Seeding 
The top four teams were seeded one through four based on their conference winning percentage. They then played a double-elimination tournament.

Results

All-Tournament Team 
The following players were named to the All-Tournament Team.

Most Valuable Player 
Anthony Bocchino was named Tournament Most Valuable Player. Bocchino was an outfielder for Marist, who finished 3–5 in the final, with two runs and five RBI, including a grand slam in the second inning.

References 

Tournament
Metro Atlantic Athletic Conference Baseball Tournament
Metro Atlantic Athletic Conference baseball tournament